Live On Stage is a Chuck Berry album released in 2000 by Magnum Records.

Track listing
 "School Days" – 3:09
 "Sweet Little Sixteen" – 2:58
 "Roll Over Beethoven" – 3:36
 "Every Day I Have The Blues" – 4:00
 "Bio" – 3:01
 "Medley: Maybellene/Mountain Dew" – 2:46
 "Let It Rock" – 3:42
 "Medley: Carol/Little Queenie" – 4:15
 "Key To The Highway" – 5:07
 "Got My Mojo Working" – 3:29
 "Reelin' & Rockin'" – 8:59
 "Johnny B. Goode" – 2:53

References

Chuck Berry live albums
2000 live albums